Audrey Shore Henshall  (1927 – 14 December 2021) was a British archaeologist known for her work on Scottish chambered cairns, prehistoric pottery and early textiles, including clothing found preserved in peat bogs.

Life and work 
Henshall was born in Oldham, Lancashire, in 1927, and studied at the University of Edinburgh, graduating with an MA in 1949. From 1960 to 1971 she was the Assistant Keeper of Archaeology at the National Museum of Antiquities of Scotland. She was appointed Assistant Secretary of the Society of Antiquaries of Scotland in 1970, and was an honorary fellow of the Society. She was also a fellow of the London Society of Antiquaries. In 1992 a Festschrift was published in her honour and in 1993 she received an OBE "for services to archaeology". She has been called "a leading authority in a number of fields in early archaeology". She was awarded the Dorothy Marshall Medal by the Society of Antiquaries of Scotland in 2016 for her outstanding voluntary contribution to Scottish archaeological or related work. Henshall died in Edinburgh on 14 December 2021, at the age of 94.

Chambered cairns 
Her research in this area led to two "significant" volumes on the "chambered tombs of Scotland", published in 1963 and 1972. They were well received by reviewers with comments like "grand result...scholarly work of science and art", and together regarded as a "classic work of reference for the subject". These were followed by four co-authored books about chambered cairns in specific parts of northern Scotland.

 The chambered tombs of Scotland. Vol.1, Edinburgh University Press 1963
 The chambered tombs of Scotland. Vol.2, Edinburgh University Press 1972
 The chambered cairns of Orkney: an inventory of the structures and their contents, with J.L. Davidson, Edinburgh University Press, 1989
 The chambered cairns of Caithness: an inventory of the structures and their contents, with J.L. Davidson, Edinburgh University Press, 1991
 The chambered cairns of Sutherland: an inventory of the structures and their contents, with J.N.G. Ritchie. Edinburgh University Press 1995
 The chambered cairns of the Central Highlands: an inventory of the structures and their contents, with J.N.G. Ritchie. Edinburgh University Press 2001
 
Henshall also published:
 The excavation of a chambered cairn at Embo, Sutherland. Proceedings of the Society of Antiquaries of Scotland; 96, 1962-1963 
 Scottish chambered tombs and long mounds. In Renfrew, Colin, British Prehistory, Duckworth, 1974

Prehistoric pottery 
Henshall was knowledgeable about prehistoric pottery, which was found amongst the grave goods in the tombs, and described in the books on chambered cairns. One writer considers her "major contributions" have been "in the fields of funerary and ceramic studies". Some of her articles on pottery can be found in the Proceedings of the Society of Antiquaries of Scotland, for example, articles on: 
 Pottery and stone implements from Ness of Gruting (vol. 84)
 Beakers from Cawdor (vol. 114)

Early textiles 
Much of her work on textiles was published in the 1950s and 1960s. In this she was encouraged by the expert Grace Crowfoot with whom she co-authored several articles. Her work on the Gunnister Man's 300-year-old clothing found in a peat bog in Shetland attracted wide interest as did her identification of colours used in centuries-old textiles. The tartan pattern discovered at Dungiven led to the revival of "an authentic early 17th century tartan". Descriptions of early textiles and clothing designs arising from her forensic examination have been said to be amongst her "most fascinating work".
 Note on an early stocking in "sprang" technique found near Micklegate Bar, York, Yorkshire Philosophical Society 1951
Clothing and other articles from a late 17th-century grave at Gunnister, Shetland, with Stuart Maxwell, 1954
 Early textiles found in Scotland, with Stuart Maxwell. Society of Antiquaries of Scotland 1956
 Early textiles found in Scotland. Part II medieval imports, with G.M. Crowfoot and J. Beckwith. Edinburgh, 1956
 The Dungiven costume: (a study of 17th century native dress in Ulster) with Wilfred Seaby. With contributions by A.T. Lucas, A.G. Smith and A. Connor. Ulster Journal of Archaeology. vols. 24-25 (1961–62)
 Five tablet-woven seal tags, Royal Archaeological Institute 1965
More of her articles on textiles can be found in the Proceedings of the Society of Antiquaries of Scotland, for example:
 Textile impression on iron fragment from Dun Cuier, Barra (vol. 89)
 Clothing found at Huntsgarth, Orkney (vol. 101)

References

External links 
Picture of Audrey Henshall at the Swona cairn

1927 births
2021 deaths
People from Oldham
20th-century archaeologists
20th-century British women writers
Archaeology of Scotland
British women archaeologists
British women historians
Fellows of the Society of Antiquaries of Scotland
Officers of the Order of the British Empire